Joshua "Josh" Ralph (born 27 October 1991) is an Australian middle-distance runner. He was a participant at the 2013 World Championships in Athletics and the 2014 Commonwealth Games and is a current Oceanian Record holder in the 4 × 800 m.

Biography
Ralph was born in Sydney and started Little Athletics at North Rocks, New South Wales, when he was nine. He was educated at Newington College where he was Captain of both Athletics and Cross Country in the schools GPS teams in 2009. Ralph went on a student exchange to France for the whole of 2010. Currently he is at the University of Sydney studying to become a Bachelor of Applied Science (Exercise and Sport Science) and also plays a number of musical instruments. In 2013 Ralph won the Balmoral Burn, an event created by fellow Old Newingtonian Phil Kearns.

References

External links 
 
 Josh Ralph at Athletics Australia
 

1991 births
Living people
People educated at Newington College
Australian male middle-distance runners
Athletes from Sydney
World Athletics Championships athletes for Australia
Athletes (track and field) at the 2014 Commonwealth Games
Athletes (track and field) at the 2018 Commonwealth Games
Commonwealth Games competitors for Australia